USS Blue has been the name of two ships of the United States Navy:

 , a  named for Rear Admiral Victor Blue (1865–1928), which served from 1937 until sunk in combat in 1942.
 , an  named for Lieutenant Commander John S. Blue (1902–1942), which served from 1944 until 1974.

United States Navy ship names